Regional development is a broad term but can be seen as a general effort to reduce regional disparities by supporting (employ) economic regions. In the past, regional development policy tended to try to achieve these objectives by means development and by attracting inward investment (OECD,2020).

A large number of international organizations such as the OECD, UN, IMF and many more that provide assistance on economic, environmental and social issues to the less economically developed regions. Regional development can be national or international in nature. Therefore, the implications and scope of regional development may vary according to the definition of a region and how the region and its boundaries are perceived internally and externally.

By country

Canada 
 Atlantic Canada Opportunities Agency
 Economic Development Agency of Canada for the Regions of Quebec
 Federal Economic Development Initiative for Northern Ontario
 Western Economic Diversification Canada

Malaysia
 Central Terengganu Development Authority, or Lembaga Kemajuan Terengganu Tengah (KETENGAH) – official website
 Kedah Regional Development Authority, or Lembaga Kemajuan Wilayah Kedah (KEDA) – official website
 South East Johore Development Authority, or Lembaga Kemajuan Johor Tenggara (KEJORA) – official website
 South Kelantan Development Authority, or Lembaga Kemajuan Kelantan Selatan (KESEDAR) – official website

Nigeria
 AREWA Center for Regional Development (ACRD) – official website

United Kingdom
 Regional development agency

United States
 Tennessee Valley Authority

See also 

 Aid
 Development aid
 International development
 Regional science
 Regional Studies Association
 The Globalized City

Research projects 
 DEMOLOGOS
 URSPIC

Regional Development organizations 
 OECD What is Regional Development?
 ACRD Nigeria – AREWA Center for Regional Development
 European Inforegio Commission's Regional Policy Information
 IEDC Indiana Economic Development Corporation
 OECD Regional Competitiveness and Governance Division
 SWIEDC Southwest Indiana Economic Development Coalition
 UNCRD United Nations Centre for Regional Development

References

External links
 OECD What is Regional Development?
 UNCRD United Nations Centre for Regional Development 
 Enfoques Teóricos sobre el Desarrollo Regional
 AREWA Center for Regional Development

Regional geography
Development Z